Jamie Lewis (born 8 November 1991) is a Welsh professional darts player who currently plays in Professional Darts Corporation (PDC) and World Darts Federation (WDF) events. His biggest achievement to date was reaching the semi-finals of the 2018 PDC World Darts Championship where he  lost to Phil Taylor.

Career
Lewis won the World Masters and WDF World Cup boys' events in 2009.

Lewis reached the last 24 of the 2010 World Masters, losing 2–3 in sets to Ted Hankey. He also reached the semi-finals of the 2011 WDF World Cup, losing out to Martin Adams 3–6.

In January 2012, then-20-year-old Lewis successfully earned a Professional Darts Corporation tour card on day four of the PDC Pro Tour Q School. This enabled him to participate in all 2012 and 2013 Players Championships, UK Open Qualifiers and European Tour events. Lewis competed in his first UK Open in 2012, defeating Steve Farmer and Mark Stephenson before falling to Pete Hudson in the second round. In August, Lewis beat John Scott and Michael Barnard in the UK Qualifier for the fourth European Tour event of the year, the German Darts Masters, but then lost 3–6 to Richie Burnett in the first round in Stuttgart, Germany. He also still competed, and won twice, on the 2012 Youth Tour.

Lewis finished fourth on the 2012 Youth Tour Order of Merit, but was the highest player who had not already qualified for the 2013 World Championship. In Lewis' first appearance in the tournament he lost to the Philippines Lourence Ilagan in the preliminary round by four legs to three, despite leading 3–1. He was ranked world number 68 after the event. At the UK Open, Lewis lost 5–3 to Tony West in the preliminary round.

Lewis reached his first final on the main tour at the Gibraltar Darts Trophy. He beat Colin Osborne 6–4, Robert Thornton 6–5, Steve Brown 6–0, Kevin Painter 6–5 and two-time world champion Adrian Lewis 6–5. His match against Lewis guaranteed him a spot in the World Matchplay for the first time and Lewis stated that that match was his final. In the final itself he was defeated 6–1 by 16-time world champion Phil Taylor. He played Painter in the first round of the World Matchplay and was defeated 10–7. His best results in the rest of the year were in two Players Championships where he lost in the quarter-finals to Mensur Suljović and Jamie Robinson. His performances over the year saw him finish 32nd on the ProTour Order of Merit to claim the final spot in the Players Championship Finals. In Lewis' debut in the event he faced top seed Michael van Gerwen in the first round and lost 6–1.

2014
His ProTour ranking saw him qualify for the 2014 World Championship by claiming the third of sixteen spots that were available to players outside the top 32 on the main Order of Merit. Lewis played Raymond van Barneveld in the first round and was beaten 3–0, losing each set by three legs to one as he hit only three of his fourteen darts at a double. Lewis had risen 28 places during the year to be ranked world number 40.

In February 2014, Lewis reached the second Pro Tour final of his career by averaging 108.07 in defeating world number one Michael van Gerwen 6–4 in the semi-finals of the fourth UK Open Qualifier, but he could not replicate the performance in the final as he was beaten 6–1 by Brendan Dolan. He advanced to the fifth round of the UK Open for the first time a month later but was beaten 9–5 by Mensur Suljović. During the rest of the campaign, Lewis was beaten in the last 16 of three Players Championships and qualified for three European Tour events, but could not get past the second round.

2015
Lewis had taken out finishes of 141 and 125 to be 1–1 against James Wade in the first round of the 2015 World Championship. He won the first leg of the third set, but then lost six legs in a row to be knocked out 3–1. His first semi-final appearance in over a year came at the Gibraltar Darts Trophy where he was beaten 6–1 by Michael van Gerwen. Lewis was now the number two Welsh player on the Order of Merit behind Mark Webster and they teamed up at the World Cup, but suffered a surprise 5–3 loss to Hong Kong in the first round. He defeated Justin Pipe 10–7 at the World Matchplay, before losing 13–2 to Michael van Gerwen in the second round. He threw the first nine-dart finish of his PDC career at the 17th Players Championship.

At the World Grand Prix, Lewis survived two match darts from William O'Connor to edge past him 2–1 in the first round and then came from 2–0 down in sets against Michael Smith to win 3–2. In his first major event quarter-final he was defeated 3–0 by Van Gerwen. Robert Thornton missed one match dart in the first round of their Players Championship Finals to allow Lewis to win 6–5. He led Dave Chisnall 8–6 in the second round, but lost four legs on the trot, missing three darts to force a deciding leg in the final leg.

2016
Lewis lost 3–1 to Daryl Gurney in the first round of the 2016 World Championship. In the second UK Open Qualifier, Lewis reached the semi-finals and was narrowly beaten 6–5 by Alan Norris. This gave him entry in to the third round of the main event and Stephen Bunting hit legs of 12 and 11 darts to move from 8–7 down to win 9–8. In the penultimate Players Championship event, Lewis eliminated the likes of Benito van de Pas and Robert Thornton to play in the quarter-finals, where he lost 6–5 to Simon Whitlock. He recorded a 6–4 win over Jamie Caven in the opening round of the Players Championship Finals, before being knocked out 6–4 by Dave Chisnall.

2017
Lewis won a match at the World Championship at the fifth time of asking when he edged past Mick McGowan 3–2. He was knocked out by Peter Wright in the second round with a score of 4–0.

2018
Lewis failed to qualify for the 2018 PDC World Darts Championship via the Order of Merit, saying on Twitter that he was really disappointed in himself for his failure to qualify. However, he finished third at the PDPA Qualifier in Milton Keynes, winning a place in the preliminary round. After defeating Kenny Neyens in the preliminary round, and compatriot Jonny Clayton in the first round, he defeated world number two Peter Wright in the second round, before knocking out James Richardson to qualify for the quarter final.

In the quarter-final, Lewis whitewashed Darren Webster. In defeating Richardson and Webster, he became the first player to qualify for a quarter-final, and subsequently a semi-final, after starting in the preliminary round. In the semi-finals, Jamie went out 1–6 to Phil Taylor.

2019
Lewis qualified for the 2019 PDC World Darts Championship via the Order of Merit and he was seeded as 28th directly into the second round. There he faced Cody Harris, with whom he was leading 2–0, but the match went into the deciding set after Harris' comeback. In the deciding set, Lewis whitewashed the opponent and advanced into the third round. He faced the fifth seed, Daryl Gurney, and again Lewis led comfortably 1–3 on sets, and yet again the match went into the decider. Lewis won the deciding, seventh set, 2-4 and second year in a row placed among top 16 players. In the fourth round he lost to Dave Chisnall without winning a set, 0–4.

For 2019 UK Open Lewis was seeded into the fourth round and faced Adrian Lewis and defeated him in the deciding leg 9-10. In the fifth round Lewis lost 7–10 to Josh Payne.

Lewis struggled throughout the rest of the season, did not qualify for any other major tournaments or European Tour events. In Players Championship tournaments he was able to win just £7,000 during the whole year and ended up ranked very low in Pro Tour Order of Merit.

2020

Close to the cut-off for 2020 PDC World Darts Championship he slipped out of top 32 and subsequently did not qualify for the event. He was not able to defend the prize money from the semifinal two years ago and slipped down to 57th place in PDC Order of Merit. It was still enough to maintain his Tour card.

Lewis was seeded into the third round of 2020 UK Open and won over Ross Smith in the deciding leg 6–5. In the fourth round he faced Mensur Suljović and lost 4-10.

Although the season was influenced by the outbreak of COVID-19, Lewis again struggled and did not qualify for any other major tournament. He qualified for 2020 International Darts Open, but lost in the first round 0–6 to Robert Marijanovic, scoring the three dart average of only 57.72.

In September, Lewis announced that he was stepping away from the darts to focus on his private life. It was not disclosed at the time whether or not he intended to surrender his PDC Tour Card.

In October, after losing in the European Tour event, Lewis revealed that he was suffering with anxiety disorder.

Despite this statement, he played the UK Qualifier for the 2021 PDC World Darts Championship and after defeating Robert Thornton in the deciding match, he became one of the six players who secured their spot in the World Championship.

World Championship results

PDC
 2013: Preliminary round (lost to Lourence Ilagan 3–4) (legs)
 2014: First round (lost to Raymond van Barneveld 0–3) (sets)
 2015: First round (lost to James Wade 1–3)
 2016: First round (lost to Daryl Gurney 1–3)
 2017: Second round (lost to Peter Wright 0–4)
 2018: Semi-final (lost to Phil Taylor 1–6)
 2019: Fourth round (lost to Dave Chisnall 0–4)
 2021: Second round (lost to Gerwyn Price 2–3)

WDF
 2023:

Performance timeline

Career finals

PDC European tour finals: (1 runner-up)

References

External links

Jamie Lewis BDO profile
Official website

Living people
Professional Darts Corporation former tour card holders
Welsh darts players
1991 births
PDC World Cup of Darts Welsh team